SS12 may refer to:
 SS.12, a French surface-to-surface missile
 SS-12 Scaleboard, a Soviet mobile theatre ballistic missile
 , a submarine of the United States Navy
 SS12, a schottky diode electrical component
 Strada statale 12 dell'Abetone e del Brennero, a state road in Northern Italy, connecting to Austria